Muni Lall (6 August 1938 – 23 December 2019) was an Indian politician, minister and civil servant.

Early life 
He was born on 6 August 1948 to Ram Ashray Prasad into chamar caste at Bhojpur, Bihar Province, British India. He completed a B.A (Eco.) and an M.A (Pol. Sci) from Patna University. Later he was admitted to study for a PhD at the London School of Economics with a research topic on the  "Development of Tribals through Co-operativization." But he did not submit a thesis for approval due to personal problems.

Civil service 
He got selected into civil services in and held the post of SDO, Land Reforms and SDM of Chas in Bihar government for 5 years.

Later he got promoted to ADM, Supply & Rationing, M.D of Bihar State Tribal Development Corporation, Bihar State Hill Area Lift Irrigation Corp. and BIADA (Bokaro). He was also DC and DM of Bokaro district. He was then promoted to Additional Secretary, Special Secretary and Secretary in Dept. of Planning & Development in Bihar Government.

Political career
He took voluntary retirement in 1996 to join politics and held position as National President in BJP of Scheduled Caste Morcha.

In 1996, he became Member of Parliament into Lok Sabha representing Sasaram constituency. In 1998, he was re-elected from same seat and again in 1999 Lok Sabha elections. In 1999, he was appointed as Union Minister of State for Labour & Employment. He also served as -

Member of Standing Committee on Energy
Member of Consultative Committee, Ministry of Coal
Member of Standing Committee on Industry
Member of Committee on Welfare of Scheduled Caste and Scheduled Tribes

Seminars attended
He attended 88th Session of the ILC of International Labour Organization, 89th Session of the ILC of International Labour Organization, 90th Session of the ILC of International Labour Organization and 37th Session of the Indian Labour Conference.

He died at Paras Hospital in Patna district, Bihar.

External links

References

1938 births
Politicians from Patna
Living people
India MPs 1996–1997
India MPs 1998–1999
India MPs 1999–2004
Lok Sabha members from Bihar
People from Bhojpur district, India
Bharatiya Janata Party politicians from Bihar